Ralf Balzis (born 31 July 1965) is a German former professional footballer who played as a forward.

References

1965 births
Living people
German footballers
Association football forwards
Kickers Offenbach players
Hamburger SV players
Eintracht Frankfurt players
First Vienna FC players
FC Red Bull Salzburg players
VfL Osnabrück players
SG Wattenscheid 09 players
SV Wilhelmshaven players
Sportfreunde Lotte players
Bundesliga players
2. Bundesliga players
Austrian Football Bundesliga players
German expatriate footballers
German expatriate sportspeople in Austria
Expatriate footballers in Austria